Deepa M. Ollapally is research professor of international affairs and the associate director of the Sigur Center for Asian Studies at the Elliott School of International Affairs, George Washington University. She is also the director of the Rising Powers Initiative launched by the Elliott School in 2009.

Academic career 
Ollapally holds a Ph.D. in Political Science from Columbia University. Ollapally joined George Washington University in 2003. She directed the South Asia program at the U.S. Institute of Peace from 1998-2003, and taught at Swarthmore College from 1990-97. From 1996-98, Ollapally served as fellow of the Strategic Studies Unit at the National Institute of Advanced Studies in Bangalore, India.

Her research has focused on security and politics in Asia, particularly nuclear nonproliferation, extremism, gender, and identity politics in the region. Her current research focuses on domestic foreign policy debates in India and their implications for regional security and global leadership of the United States. She is an advisory council member for Women in Security, Conflict Management and Peace, New Delhi, and served on the board of directors for Women in International Security, Washington D.C.  She is a familiar  face in discussions and debates on foreign policy in India and abroad.

Selected publications 
 (co-ed. with Henry R. Nau) Worldviews of Aspiring Powers: Domestic Foreign Policy Debates in China, India, Iran, Japan, and Russia (Oxford University Press, 2012). Review by G. John Ikenberry, Foreign Affairs, January/February 2013ISBN 0199985995 
 The Politics of Extremism in South Asia (Cambridge University Press, 2008)

Personal life 
Ollapally is married to G. "Anand" Anandalingam, dean of the Imperial College Business School at Imperial College London, and is the mother of two children and owner of a beagle mix dog named Dash.

References

External links 
 George Washington University faculty page
 Rising Powers Initiative

George Washington University faculty
Elliott School of International Affairs faculty
Columbia Graduate School of Arts and Sciences alumni
Asian studies
Living people
Place of birth missing (living people)
Year of birth missing (living people)
Indian foreign policy writers
International relations scholars
American academics of Indian descent
Historians of South Asia
21st-century Indian women writers
21st-century American women writers
Indian political scientists
American political scientists
Geopoliticians
21st-century Indian women scientists
21st-century American women scientists